FC Feronikeli 74, commonly referred to as Feronikeli 74 and colloquially known as Feronikeli is a professional football club based in Drenas, Kosovo. The club play in the Football Superleague of Kosovo, which is the top tier of football in the country.

History
In 1974, the club was founded as Nikeli. During the spring and summer of 1974, an intense activity took place in all aspects for the formation of the football club, its registration and inclusion in the Inter-Municipal Football League level, namely, at the District League of Pristina. At the top of this activity was the physical education teacher, Hashim Mala.

On 8 April 1974, the Founding Assembly of the Football Club was held in the Glogovac Municipal Assembly Hall. In this assembly was founded the club, which was named Nikeli with headquarters in Glogovac. Then, the headship of the club was elected, the 11-member presidency with Tahir Ajazi as president, vice-president Murtes Zogu, secretary Jusuf Dobra, treasurer Habib Kukiqi and board members were Fetah Elshani, Ismail Bajraktari, Mehdi Bardhi, Nazif Sejda, Rade Jevremović, Remzi Heta and Sylejman Kastrati. This assembly elected Mehdi Bardhi as technical director, while coach was Hashim Mala.

The club has historically closely been associated with NewCo Feronikeli, the nearby ore mining and metallurgical complex, ever since the plant was built in 1984. In the 2014–15 season they were crowned champions for the first time in the club's history. They won the 2018–19 championship as well, qualifying for the UEFA Champions League preliminary rounds for the first time in their history.

Stadium
The club has played its home games at the Rexhep Rexhepi Stadium is a multi-purpose stadium in Glogovac, Kosovo. The stadium has a capacity of 6,000 people all seater and is named after the club's former player and captain Rexhep Rexhepi, who fought for the Kosovo Liberation Army and was killed on 12 February 1999 by Serb forces during KLA insurgency right before the start of the Kosovo War.

Supporters

Tigrat e Zi are the clubs' supporters. The supporters stand in the West part of the stadium.

Honours

Players

Current squad

Personnel

List of the managers
This is the list of coaches of FC Feronikeli 74 since 2010:

FC Feronikeli 74 in Europe
Feronikeli will compete in the UEFA Champions League for the first time in the 2019–20 season, entering at the preliminary round. On 11 June 2019, in Nyon, the draw was held and Feronikeli were drawn against the Gibraltarian side Lincoln Red Imps. On 25 June 2019, Feronikeli beat the Gibraltarian side Lincoln Red Imps at Fadil Vokrri Stadium in Pristina.

After being eliminated from The New Saints, Feronikeli continued to play in the second qualifying round of UEFA Europa League. On 17 July 2019, Feronikeli learns the upcoming rival which was the champion of 2018–19 Slovak First Football League, Slovan Bratislava.

References

External links
 

 
1974 establishments in Yugoslavia
1974 establishments in Kosovo
Association football clubs established in 1974
Association football clubs established in 2022
Feronikeli
Feronikeli